The 2019 Harlow District Council election took place on 2 May 2019 to elect members of Harlow District Council in Essex. This was on the same day as other local elections. The council remained under Labour Party control, with no seats changing hands.

After the election, the composition of the council remained at:
Labour 20
Conservative 13

Ward results

Bush Fair

Church Langley

Great Parndon

Harlow Common

Little Parndon and Hare Street

Mark Hall

Netteswell

Old Harlow

Staple Tye

Summers and Kingsmoor

Toddbrook

References

2018 English local elections
2019
2010s in Essex